John Edwin Midwinter OBE FRS FREng (8 March 1938 – 13 November 2021) was a British electrical engineer and professor, who was President of the Institution of Electrical Engineers (now IET) from 2000 to 2001.

Education
He was educated at St Bartholomew's School, King's College London (BSc Physics, 1961) and the University of London (PhD, 1968).

Career
From the 1970s, John’s research centred on optical fibre communications, and he led the speedy deployment of optical communications infrastructure in the UK while at British Telecom. He was subsequently the BT Professor of Optoelectronics at University College London from 1984 to 1991 and Pender Professor of Electronic Engineering from 1991 to 2004, and was Vice Provost from 1994-1999. He was subsequently made an Emeritus Professor there. He was also a member of the Parliamentary Office of Science & Technology Advisory Board. He was President of IEE (now IET) UK in 2000.

Awards
He was made an OBE and elected to Fellow  of the Royal Academy of Engineering in 1984 and a Fellow of the Royal Society in 1985. He delivered the Clifford Paterson Lecture of the Royal Society in 1983 and was awarded the IEE JJ Thomson Medal  in 1987 and the Faraday Medal of the Institution of Electrical Engineers in 1997. He was awarded Honorary Doctorates  from Nottingham University in 2000, Loughborough University in 2001 & Queens University Belfast in 2004, UK. In 2000 he presented the Bernard Price Memorial Lecture. In 2002, he was awarded the IEEE Eric E. Sumner Award.

Personal life
Midwinter died on 13 November 2021, at the age of 83.

Books

References

1938 births
2021 deaths
People educated at St. Bartholomew's School
Alumni of King's College London
Associates of King's College London
Alumni of the University of London
Officers of the Order of the British Empire
Fellows of the Institution of Engineering and Technology
Fellows of the Royal Academy of Engineering
Fellows of the Royal Society
Academics of University College London
People from Newbury, Berkshire